Someday is a Eurodance song written by famous Swedish singer and songwriter Orup for Alcazar's second studio album Alcazarized. It was also made as an official song for the 2003 Stockholm Pride festival.

Music video
A music video was produced to promote the single.

Formats and track listings
These are the formats and track listings of promotional single releases of "Someday".

CD single
"Original Version" - 4:28
"Studio 54 Revival Remix" - 4:16

Chart performance

References

Alcazar (band) songs
2003 singles
RCA Records singles
Songs written by Orup
2003 songs